The Worshipful Company of Firefighters is one of the 110 livery companies of the City of London. The Company's aim is to promote the development and advancement of the science, art and the practice of firefighting, fire prevention and life safety. It operates essentially as a charitable organisation, and also encourages professionalism and the exchange of information between members and others who work in allied fields.

One of the new City livery companies, its origins date from 1988 with the founding of the Guild of Firefighters.  The Company of Firefighters was recognised by the City of London Corporation from 13 June 1995 as a company without livery; it was granted livery by the Court of Aldermen on 23 October 2001, thereby becoming the Worshipful Company of Firefighters. It received its Royal Charter on the 11th December 2013.

The Firefighters' Company ranks 103rd in the livery companies' order of precedence and is based at The Wax Chandlers' Hall on Gresham Street a building it co-habits with the Worshipful Company of Wax Chandlers. The Clerk to the Firefighters' Company is Steven Tamcken and the Beadle, since foundation as a Guild in 1988, is John E P Norris SBStJ (pictured right).

The Firefighters' coat of arms is blazoned: Quarterly: 1 and 3, Argent on three Bars wavy Azure a Firehelmet Or; 2 and 4, Argent over all a Cross Gules and in pale a Sword downwards Argent; and, its motto is Flammas Oppugnantes Fidimus Deo.  The Company's Church is St Mary-Le-Bow

References

External links
Firefighters' Company website

Firefighters
1995 establishments in England